The 1832 United States presidential election in Maine took place between November 2 and December 5, 1832, as part of the 1832 United States presidential election. Voters chose ten representatives, or electors to the Electoral College, who voted for President and Vice President.

Maine voted for the Democratic Party candidate, Andrew Jackson, over the National Republican candidate, Henry Clay, and the Anti-Masonic Party candidate, William Wirt. Jackson won the state by a margin of 10.70%.

Results

See also
 United States presidential elections in Maine

References

Maine
1832
1832 Maine elections